Hong Kong Velodrome is a velodrome in Tseung Kwan O, Hong Kong. It has a 250-metre cycling track and spectator facilities for 3,000 people. It opened on 30 December 2013 next to the Tseung Kwan O Sports Ground.

History

The Hong Kong government agreed to build the velodrome after Wong Kam-po won the gold medal for the men's road race in the 2006 Asian Games at Doha, amid concerns that athletes who represent Hong Kong had to rely on training facilities in China. Construction of the HK$1.1 billion venue got the legislative go-ahead in January 2010 and work began two months later.

On 5 November 2012, Chief Secretary Carrie Lam kicked off construction of the Tseung Kwan O Velodrome, as it was then known. The velodrome occupies 6.6 hectares, and cycling helmets inspired its wavy rooftop design. Mrs Lam officiated at the ceremony marking the start of construction.

The velodrome officially opened on 30 December 2013. The inaugural international event, the 2014 Hong Kong International Track Cup (a UCI class-one event), was held 10–12 January 2014.

On 3 March 2014, Lleyton Hewitt, Tomas Berdych, Sam Stosur and Li Na played in the BNP Paribas Showdown exhibition tennis matches at the Velodrome, all 3,000 tickets were sold out. Li and Stosur were complimentary about the unusual location for a tennis event, which featured ground-level VIP seating on either side and spectator stands at both ends inside the 250-metre cycling track.

On 2 May 2015, the International Cycling Union (UCI) awarded the final leg of its 2015–16 UCI Track Cycling World Cup to Hong Kong, The Cycling Association of Hong Kong hosted a round of the World Cup for the first time on 16–17 January 2016. Racing took place at the Hong Kong Velodrome.

In March 2016, the UCI announced that the Hong Kong Velodrome had been selected as the venue for the 2017 UCI Track Cycling World Championships.

Facilities

Velodrome
The velodrome comprises a 250-metre long, 7-metre wide wooden cycling track surrounded by 2,000 fixed seats and 1,000 retractable seats. Supporting facilities include changing rooms, a press conference room, drug testing rooms, and a pressroom.

Sports centre
The space within the centre of the cycle track forms a multi-purpose area for basketball, volleyball, badminton, gymnastics and other sports, but the space is closed to the public whenever the cycling track is being used.

The remainder of the public sports centre is located on the ground floor, beneath the cycle track level, comprising a table tennis room, a dance room, a fitness room, activity rooms, and a children's playroom.

Town park
The Hong Kong Velodrome Park is a 5.3-hectare park surrounding the velodrome building. The park includes grassy lawns, a restaurant, artificial lakes, a concrete skatepark, a jogging track, chess tables, an amphitheatre, and a climbing wall.

References

External links 

Town Park, Indoor Velodrome-cum-sports Centre in Area 45, Tseung Kwan O P & T Group.
Town Park, Indoor Velodrome-cum-Sports Centre. Area 45, Tseung Kwan O.

Tseung Kwan O
Indoor arenas in Hong Kong
Sports venues in Hong Kong
Cycle racing in Hong Kong
Velodromes in China
Sports venues completed in 2013